Alfredo Deza Ganoza (born 24 August 1979) is a former Peruvian athlete specializing in the high jump. He was born in Lobitos, Talara, Piura. He is best known for winning gold at the 1998 World Junior Championships becoming the country's first and so far only World Junior Championships medalist.

He represented his country at the 2004 Olympic Games in Athens, but did not progress to the final.

His personal best jump is 2.27 metres from 2003. His father, Alfredo Deza Fuller, was also an Olympic athlete competing in the 110 metres hurdles.

Competition record

References

 

1979 births
Living people
Peruvian male high jumpers
Athletes (track and field) at the 1999 Pan American Games
Athletes (track and field) at the 2003 Pan American Games
Athletes (track and field) at the 2004 Summer Olympics
Olympic athletes of Peru
Pan American Games competitors for Peru
20th-century Peruvian people